Thomas Gayle Pool (February 10, 1935 – July 7, 1990) was an American sport shooter who competed in the 1964 Summer Olympics.

A multiple times world champion and Olympic medalist, Pool was inducted into the USA Shooting Hall of fame.

References

External links
 

1935 births
1990 deaths
American male sport shooters
United States Distinguished Marksman
ISSF rifle shooters
Shooters at the 1964 Summer Olympics
Olympic bronze medalists for the United States in shooting
Medalists at the 1964 Summer Olympics
People from Bowie, Texas
Pan American Games medalists in shooting
Pan American Games gold medalists for the United States
Pan American Games silver medalists for the United States
Pan American Games bronze medalists for the United States
Shooters at the 1959 Pan American Games